Joshua Aaron Wilson (born March 26, 1981) is an American former professional baseball infielder. Wilson is a Mt. Lebanon, Pennsylvania native. He was part of the 1998 Pennsylvania state championship baseball team and Pennsylvania Player of the Year. Wilson played in Major League Baseball (MLB) for the Florida Marlins, Washington Nationals, Tampa Bay Devil Rays, Arizona Diamondbacks, San Diego Padres, Seattle Mariners, Milwaukee Brewers, Texas Rangers and Detroit Tigers.

Career

Florida Marlins
Wilson was drafted by the Florida Marlins in third round of the 1999 Major League Baseball draft. Wilson passed up a scholarship to Louisiana State University to sign with the Marlins. He received a $400,000 signing bonus. Wilson began his professional career with the Gulf Coast League Marlins. Wilson batted .266 with 54 hits, 9 doubles, 4 triples, 27 RBIs, and 14 stolen bases in 53 games. On the team, Wilson was first in plate appearances (237), at-bats (203), hits; was tied for first in runs (29), triples; and was second in doubles, and RBIs. In 2000, Wilson split the season between the Class-A Short-Season Utica Blue Sox of the New York–Penn League, and the Class-A Kane County Cougars of the Midwest League. With the Blue Sox, Wilson batted .344 with 89 hits, 13 doubles, 6 triples, 3 home runs, 43 RBIs, and 9 stolen bases in 66 games. Wilson was second in the New York—Penn League in batting average, and was tied for second in hits. After his stint with the Blue Sox, Wilson was promoted to the Kane County Cougars. With the Cougars, he batted .269 with 14 hits, 3 doubles, 1 triple, 1 home run, and 6 RBIs in 13 games. The next season, 2001, Wilson played for the Class-A Kane County Cougars. He batted .285 with 144 hits, 28 doubles, 5 triples, 4 home runs, 61 RBIs, and 17 stolen bases in 123 games. Wilson was second on the Cougars in doubles, and caught stealing (11); and was third in games played, plate appearances (546), at-bats (506), hits, doubles, and stolen bases.

Wilson was called up to the Marlins in September 2005. He made his Major League debut on September 7 against the Washington Nationals, popping out as a pinch hitter in the seventh inning. He did not record his first hit until the last game of the season, on October 2 against the Atlanta Braves, when he doubled to left field in the bottom of the 10th off of Kyle Davies and then scored the winning run on a single by Juan Pierre.

Colorado Rockies
On January 6, 2006, he was traded to the Colorado Rockies for a player to be named later, but he missed the first part of the 2006 season after being placed on the 60-day disabled list with a broken toe. He played in 89 games that season with the AAA Colorado Springs Sky Sox, hitting .307, but did not get called up to the Majors.

Washington Nationals
Wilson signed as a free agent with the Washington Nationals on November 8, 2006.

In 2007, he appeared in 15 games for the Nationals before they placed him on waivers.

Tampa Bay Devil Rays
He was claimed by the Tampa Bay Devil Rays on May 10, 2007, and appeared in 90 games for them during the season. On June 8, 2007, Wilson pitched a scoreless 8th inning in a relief pitching appearance against the  Marlins in a 14-8 loss.

Pittsburgh Pirates
On December 3, 2007, he was claimed off waivers by the Pittsburgh Pirates. He was assigned to the AAA Indianapolis Indians, where he hit .276 in 97 games.

Boston Red Sox
In August 2008, Wilson was acquired by the Boston Red Sox and assigned to their Triple-A affiliate, the Pawtucket Red Sox. Wilson's acquisition by the Sox completed a three team deal which sent Manny Ramirez to the Los Angeles Dodgers from the Red Sox, Jason Bay to the Red Sox from the Pirates and infielder Andy LaRoche, and pitcher Bryan Morris from the Dodgers, and outfielder Brandon Moss and pitcher Craig Hansen from the Red Sox to the Pirates.

Arizona Diamondbacks
In December 2008, he signed with the Arizona Diamondbacks. While on the Diamondbacks he helped turn a triple play against the Dodgers and was once again used as a relief pitcher, throwing a 90 mph fastball.

San Diego Padres
Wilson was designated for assignment on May 14 by the Diamondbacks and was picked up by the San Diego Padres on waivers on May 15.

On June 7, 2009, he pitched for the Padres against the Diamondbacks in the 18th inning of an extra inning game. He allowed a three-run, opposite field, game-winning home run to Mark Reynolds on an 88-MPH, cut fastball. He was the losing pitcher in a 9-6 Diamondbacks win. It was the second pitching appearance of the season for Wilson, who also pitched a scoreless 9th inning for the Diamondbacks against the Cincinnati Reds on May 11.

Seattle Mariners
On June 19, Wilson was claimed off waivers by the Seattle Mariners. While with the Seattle Mariners, he was affectionately nicknamed "The Paperboy" by Ken Griffey Jr. With the Mariners in '09 he hit .250 with eight doubles, one triple, three home runs and 10 RBIs in 45 games giving him a combined average of .219 with 42 hits in 72 games between Arizona, San Diego and Seattle. Then on December 10, 2009 Wilson re-signed with the Mariners. On December 10, 2010 Wilson resigned with the Mariners to the tune of $725,000.

On March 28, 2011, the Mariners released Wilson.

Second stint with the Diamondbacks
On March 31, 2011, Wilson reportedly agreed to a minor league contract to return to the Diamondbacks. Wilson had his contract purchased by Arizona on April 25. He was designated for assignment on May 23.

Milwaukee Brewers
Wilson was claimed off waivers by the Milwaukee Brewers on May 25, 2011. In only his second appearance for the Brewers, Wilson hit a pinch hit home run. Only a week later he hit his 2nd home run, which was a go-ahead homer in extra innings against the Marlins. While with the Brewers, Wilson turned the second triple play of his career.

Atlanta Braves
Wilson signed a contract with the Atlanta Braves on November 22, 2011 but suffered a setback injury during spring training and never made it to the big leagues with the club.

Third stint with the Diamondbacks
Wilson returned to the Diamondbacks for the third time in 2013 and made the big league roster out of spring training. He was designated for assignment on June 21, 2013.

Texas Rangers
Wilson signed a minor league deal with the Texas Rangers on December 12, 2013. He was designated for assignment on May 8, 2014. Wilson elected free agency in October 2014.

Detroit Tigers
On January 12, 2015, the Detroit Tigers signed Wilson to a minor league contract. On June 2, Wilson was called up by the Detroit Tigers from Triple-A Toledo Mud Hens. On June 20, Wilson made the fourth pitching appearance of his career against the New York Yankees, giving up a solo home run to Chris Young before pitching the rest of the eighth inning. He was designated for assignment by the Tigers on July 7, 2015. He was outrighted to the Triple-A Toledo Mud Hens on July 8. Wilson batted .252 with three home runs, 30 RBIs, and 10 stolen bases for the Mud Hens. He was called up by the Tigers on September 8, 2015 as a September call-up.

York Revolution
On April 8, 2016, Wilson signed with the York Revolution of the Atlantic League of Professional Baseball. Wilson played in 120 games for the Revolution in 2016, posting a .255 batting average and 28 doubles.

Second stint with the Rangers
On April 18, 2017, Wilson was signed by the Texas Rangers to a minor league contract.

Cleveland Indians
The Rangers traded Wilson to the Cleveland Indians in exchange for cash considerations on June 1, 2017. He elected free agency on November 6, 2017.

Post playing career
On January 7, 2019, Wilson was named to the scouting staff for the Detroit Tigers.

References

External links

1981 births
Living people
Baseball players from Pennsylvania
Major League Baseball infielders
Sportspeople from Mt. Lebanon, Pennsylvania
Florida Marlins players
Washington Nationals players
Tampa Bay Devil Rays players
Arizona Diamondbacks players
San Diego Padres players
Seattle Mariners players
Milwaukee Brewers players
Texas Rangers players
Detroit Tigers players
Gulf Coast Marlins players
Kane County Cougars players
Utica Blue Sox players
Portland Sea Dogs players
Jupiter Hammerheads players
Carolina Mudcats players
Phoenix Desert Dogs players
Albuquerque Isotopes players
Grand Canyon Rafters players
Colorado Springs Sky Sox players
Indianapolis Indians players
Pawtucket Red Sox players
Reno Aces players
Tacoma Rainiers players
Gwinnett Braves players
Round Rock Express players
Toledo Mud Hens players
York Revolution players
Columbus Clippers players